The 2007 Men's Indoor Hockey World Cup was the second edition of the Men's Indoor Hockey World Cup and held from 14 to 18 February 2007 in Vienna, Austria. 

Germany were the reigning champions and defended their title by beating Poland 4-1 in the final. Spain won their first medal by beating the Czech Republic 3-1 in the bronze-medal match.

Results

Pool A

Pool B

Fifth to twelfth place classification

Eleventh and twelfth place

Ninth and tenth place

Seventh and eighth place

Fifth and sixth place

First to fourth place classification

Semi-finals

Third and fourth place

Final

Final ranking

Source

See also
 2007 Women's Indoor Hockey World Cup

References

External links
 Official website

World Cup
Indoor Hockey World Cup Men
Indoor Hockey World Cup
Sports competitions in Vienna
Indoor Hockey World Cup Men
International indoor hockey competitions hosted by Austria